Ballerup-Skovlunde Fodbold, commonly known as BSF, is an association football club based in the town of Ballerup, Denmark, that competes in the Denmark Series, the fourth tier of the Danish football league system. Founded in 2010 as a merger between Ballerup Boldklub and Skovlunde IF, the club play at their home ground Ballerup Idrætspark. Their colours are red and white. BSF is affiliated to the local football association, DBU Zealand. The women's team is one of the strongest in Denmark, competing in the highest tier Elitedivisionen.

References

External links
Official website 
Ballerup Idrætspark at Nordic Stadiums

Football clubs in Denmark
Association football clubs established in 2010
2010 establishments in Denmark
Ballerup
Ballerup-Skovlunde Fodbold